Wilfred Potter (2 May 1910 – 4 March 1994) was an English cricketer.  Potter was a right-handed batsman who bowled leg break.  He was born at Swincliffe, near Harrogate, Yorkshire.

Potter made a single first-class appearance for Warwickshire against Derbyshire at the County Ground, Derby, in the 1932 County Championship.  In Derbyshire's first-innings of 108, Potter took the wicket of Stan Worthington to finish with figures of 1/19 from 8 overs.  In Warwickshire's first-innings of 111, Potter was dismissed for a duck by Thomas Armstrong, while in Derbyshire's second-innings of 214/7 declared, he bowled 4 wicketless overs.  Warwickshire were set a target of 212 for victory, but could only make 88, with Potter making his second duck of the match when he was dismissed by Armstrong.  This was his only major appearance for Warwickshire.

He died at Birmingham, Warwickshire on 4 March 1994.

References

External links
Wilfred Potter at ESPNcricinfo
Wilfred Potter at CricketArchive

1910 births
1994 deaths
People from Nidderdale
English cricketers
Warwickshire cricketers